Robert Joseph Faricy (May 9, 1856 – October 19, 1933) was an American politician and farmer.

Faricy was born in Credit River, Scott County, Minnesota in 1856. He was a farmer. Faricy served on the Credit River School Board and was the Credit River Township Assessor. Faricy served in the Minnesota House of Representatives from 1887 to 1890 and was a Democrat. In 1920, Faricy retired and moved to Saint Paul, Minnesota where he died His grandson Ray W. Faricy also served in the Minnesota House of Representatives.

References

1856 births
1933 deaths
People from Scott County, Minnesota
Farmers from Minnesota
School board members in Minnesota
Democratic Party members of the Minnesota House of Representatives